David Hunter is a British actor and singer best known for his work in musical theatre. He is originally from Warrington. Hunter played Dr Pomatter in the Tony Award winning musical Waitress at The Adelphi Theatre, West End from 2019 to 2020. He trained at The Liverpool Institute for Performing Arts (LIPA).  

Hunter is married to actor and business owner Tara Dixon, and together they have two children.

Stage career 
In 2011 Hunter was part of the original cast of One Man, Two Guvnors at the Royal National Theatre, subsequently transferring to the Adelphi Theatre in the West End. 

In 2013 he went on to appear in the musical adaptation of The Hired Man at Colchester Mercury and Leicester Curve. 

In May 2014 he took over the role of "Guy" in the West End production of Once, having previously understudied the role.

In August 2016 he replaced Killian Donnely in the role of Charlie Price in the West End production of Kinky Boots at the Adelphi Theatre.

In 2019 he joined the original West End cast of Waitress, again at the Adelphi Theatre, in the role of Doctor Pomatter. He was then cast to reprise his role his role for the 2022-23 UK National Tour.

Filmography

Stage

Superstar 
Hunter took part in the UK TV series Superstar in an attempt to win the role of Jesus Christ in a new arena production of Jesus Christ Superstar. He was chosen as one of the eleven finalists on the show in which began in July 2012. He made it to the semi-finals where he was eliminated on 24 July 2012.

Performances on Superstar

References

Living people
English male stage actors
English male musical theatre actors
Year of birth missing (living people)
Male actors from Warrington